Ayaou-Sran is a town in central Ivory Coast. It is a sub-prefecture of Sakassou Department in Gbêkê Region, Vallée du Bandama District.

Ayaou-Sran was a commune until March 2012, when it became one of 1126 communes nationwide that were abolished.

In 2014, the population of the sub-prefecture of Ayaou-Sran was 17,713.

Villages

The 3 villages of the sub-prefecture of Ayaou-Sran and their population in 2014 are:

Notes

Sub-prefectures of Gbêkê
Former communes of Ivory Coast